The chief justice of Queensland is the senior judge of the Supreme Court of Queensland and the highest ranking judicial officer in the Australian state of Queensland. The chief justice is both the judicial head of the Supreme Court, as well as the administrative head, responsible for arranging the business of the court and establishing its rules and procedures.

The current chief justice is Helen Bowskill, who was sworn in on 22 March 2022. Justice Bowskill is the second female chief justice of the Supreme Court of Queensland after her predecessor, Catherine Holmes SC.

List of Chief Justices of Queensland

See also

 Judiciary of Australia
 Supreme Court of Queensland

References

 
Lists of judges of Australian superior courts